Events in the year 1987 in Germany.

Incumbents
President – Richard von Weizsäcker
Chancellor – Helmut Kohl

Events 
25 January – West German federal election, 1987
20 February–3 March – 37th Berlin International Film Festival
12 March – The third cabinet Kohl led by Helmut Kohl was sworn in.
26 March – Germany in the Eurovision Song Contest 1987
17 May – Rhineland-Palatinate state election, 1987
12 June–20 September – documenta 8
12 June – "Tear down this wall!" speech by Ronald Reagan in Berlin
 September – Olof Palme Peace March
 Date unknown: German company Mannesmann acquired German company ZF Sachs.

Births

8 January – Carmen Klaschka, German tennis player
20 January – Janin Lindenberg, German sprinter
9 February – Magdalena Neuner, German professional biathlete. She is the most successful woman of all time at Biathlon World Championships 
4 April – Sami Khedira, German footballer
19 April – Daniel Schuhmacher, German singer and winner of Deutschland sucht den Superstar (season 6)
20 April
Thorsten Kirschbaum, German footballer
Michael Klauß, German footballer
29 April – Christian Reitz, German sport shooter
18 June – Vanessa Hegelmaier, German model
3 July – Sebastian Vettel, German racing driver
22 August – Mischa Zverev, German tennis player
18 September – Johanna Uekermann, German politician
25 October – Fabian Hambüchen, German gymnast
11 December – Peter Scholze, German mathematician

Deaths

15 January – George Markstein, German-born English journalist and thriller writer (kidney failure; born 1926)
29 January – Otto Klemperer, physicist (born 1899)
1 February – Gustav Knuth, German actor (born 1901)
8 February – Max Seydewitz, German politician (born 1892)
10 February – Hans Rosenthal, German television presenter (born 1925)
13 March – Bernhard Grzimek, German zoo director, zoologist, book author, editor, and animal conservationist in postwar West-Germany (born 1909)
26 March – Eugen Jochum, German conductor (born 1902)
8 May – Carl Tchilinghiryan, German businessman (born 1910)
7 July – Hannelore Schroth, German actress (born 1922)
26 August – Georg Wittig, German chemist, Nobel Prize in Chemistry laureate (born 1897)
5 September – Wolfgang Fortner, German composer (born 1907)
16 October – Joseph Höffner, German cardinal of the Roman Catholic Church (born 1906)
28 November – Wolfgang Liebeneiner, German actor and film director (born 1905)
9 December – Prince Ernest Augustus of Hanover (born 1914)
18 December – Conny Plank, German musician (born 1940)
22 December – Gustav Fröhlich, German actor (born 1902)
31 December – Wolfgang Zeidler, German judge (born 1924)

See also
1987 in German television

References

 
Years of the 20th century in Germany
1980s in Germany
Germany
Germany